Noon is an unincorporated community in Benton County, Oregon, United States. It is west of Flynn and Philomath.

Unincorporated communities in Benton County, Oregon
Unincorporated communities in Oregon